is a 1949 black and white Japanese film directed by Yasushi Sasaki.

Cast 
 Hibari Misora
 Masuda Takashi

References

External links 
 

Japanese black-and-white films
1955 films
Films directed by Yasushi Sasaki
Shochiku films
1950s Japanese films